Hylopezus is a genus of bird in the family Grallariidae.

It contains the following species:
 Masked antpitta (Hylopezus auricularis)
 Amazonian antpitta (Hylopezus berlepschi)
 Thicket antpitta (Hylopezus dives)
 White-lored antpitta (Hylopezus fulviventris)
 Spotted antpitta (Hylopezus macularius)
 White-browed antpitta (Hylopezus ochroleucus)
 Streak-chested antpitta (Hylopezus perspicillatus)
 Snethlage's antpitta (Hylopezus paraensis)  
 Alta Floresta antpitta (Hylopezus whittakeri)

 
Bird genera
Taxa named by Robert Ridgway
Taxonomy articles created by Polbot